Lake Anna State Park is a state park located in Spotsylvania County in Virginia. Initially, the site of the Goodwin Gold Mine – gold was first discovered at the site in 1829 – the land later played host to Lake Anna, a reservoir created to serve as a coolant for Dominion Power's nearby nuclear power plant.  It was created by damming up the North Anna River.  Work to create the park began in 1972 and it opened formally in 1983.

References
Park website

State parks of Virginia
Parks in Spotsylvania County, Virginia
Protected areas established in 1983
1983 establishments in Virginia
Beaches of Virginia